This is a list of military aircraft used by the Royal Naval Air Service (RNAS).

Aircraft in squadron use
 AD Flying Boat - 29 built
 Airco DH.4
 Airco DH.6
 Airco DH.9
 Armstrong Whitworth FK.3
 Avro 503
 Avro 504
 Beardmore WB.III
 Blériot XI
 Bréguet Type III
 Bréguet 4
 Bréguet 5
 Bristol Boxkite
 Bristol TB.8
 Bristol Scout
 Caudron G.3 140 used as trainers
 Caudron G.4 46 used as bombers
 Curtiss H.4 Small America
 Curtiss H.12 Large America
 Curtiss H.16 Large America
 Curtiss Model R
 Curtiss JN-3
 Curtiss JN-4
 Curtiss Jenny
 Franco-British Aviation Type A, B and C
 Fairey IIIA (1917)
 Fairey Campania
 Fairey Hamble Baby
 Farman F.40
 Farman HF.20
 Farman MF.7 Longhorn
 Farman MF.11 Shorthorn
 Felixstowe F.2
 Felixstowe Porte Baby
 Felixstowe F.3
 Felixstowe F.5
 Flanders B.2
 Grahame-White Type XV
 Handley Page 0/100 and 0/400
 Mann Egerton Type B
 Morane-Borel monoplane
 Morane-Saulnier BB
 Morane-Saulnier Type L
 Nieuport VI
 Nieuport 10
 Nieuport 11
 Nieuport 12
 Nieuport 17
 Nieuport 17bis
 Nieuport 21
 Nieuport 24
 Norman Thompson N.T.2B
 Norman Thompson N.T.4
 Parnall Hamble Baby Convert
 Pemberton-Billing PB.25
 REP Parasol
 Royal Aircraft Factory BE.2 - 4 BE.2As & 95 BE.2E
 Short Admiralty Type 74
 Short Bomber
 Short Folder
 Short Type 166
 Short Type 184
 Short 310-A
 Short Type 320
 Short Type 827
 Short Type 830
 Sopwith Type 807
 Sopwith Type 860
 Sopwith B.1
 Sopwith Baby
 Sopwith 1½ Strutter
 Sopwith Camel
 Sopwith Cuckoo
 Sopwith Gunbus
 Sopwith Pup
 Sopwith Tabloid
 Sopwith Three-seater
 Sopwith Triplane
 Sopwith Two-Seat Scout
 Thomas Brothers T-2
 Vickers Type 32 Gunbus
 Voisin III
 White and Thompson No. 3
 White and Thompson Bognor Bloater
 Wight Converted Seaplane
 Wight Pusher Seaplane
 Wight Seaplane

Prototypes and other minor aircraft
ASL Valkyrie
AD Boat
AD Scout
AD Navyplane
AD Seaplane Type 1000
Alcock Scout - 1 built and used operationally
Armstrong Whitworth F.K.6
Armstrong Whitworth F.K.10 - 4 used
Avro Type D
Avro 500 - 6 used.
Avro 501 - 1 used.
Avro 510
Avro 519
Avro 528
Avro 529
Avro Pike
Beardmore W.B.1
Beardmore W.B.1a
Beardmore WB.III
Beardmore W.B.V
Blackburn Blackburd
Blackburn Triplane
Blackburn Twin Blackburn
Blériot Parasol -12 used.
Borel hydro-monoplane - 8 or more used. see Etablissements Borel  
Burgess Gunbus
Caproni Ca.4
Curtiss C-1 Canada
Curtiss T Wanamaker Triplane
Dyott Bomber
FBA Type H
Fairey F.2
Flanders B.2
Felixstowe F.1
Handley Page Type G
Mann Egerton Type H
Nieuport IV
Norman Thompson N.1B
Parnall Scout
Pemberton-Billing P.B.9
Port Victoria P.V.1
Port Victoria P.V.2
Port Victoria P.V.7
Port Victoria P.V.8
Port Victoria Grain Griffin
Royal Aircraft Factory BE.8
Royal Aircraft Factory H.R.E.2
Royal Aircraft Factory RE.5
Royal Aircraft Factory RE.7
Sage Type 4
Short S.27
Short Tandem Twin (modified S.27)
Short S.36 Tractor Biplane
Short S.34 T1
Short S.38 Trainer
Short S.39 Triple Twin
Short S.41 Tractor Biplane
Short S.45 T5
Short S.46     
Short S.47 Triple Tractor T4 
Short S.53 Admiralty No. 42    
Short S.60      
Short S.63 Folder Seaplane     
Short S.69       
Short S.81 Gunbus Seaplane
Short S.82      
Short S.87 Type 135 Seaplane    
Short S.135        
Short S.301 (140 hp Salmson) Seaplane      
Short Type 310-B
Short N.2A Scout    
Short N.2B
Sopwith Bat Boat
Sopwith Bee
Sopwith D.1
Sopwith H.T. Seaplane (Hydro Tractor) biplane, also known as the Cromarty 
Sopwith Sociable
Spencer biplane
SPAD VII
Tellier T.3 Flying-Boat
Westland N.1B
Wight Twin

Airships
 His Majesty's Airship No. 1 "Mayfly"
 His Majesty's Naval Airship No. 2 (Willows No. 4)
 No. 9r
 23 class airship
 R23X class airship
 R.29
 R31 class airship
 R33 class airship
 Astra-Torres airship
 SS class airship
 SSP class airship
 SST class airship
 SSZ class airship
 Coastal class airship
 C Star class airship
 NS class airship

Unmanned aerial vehicles
 British unmanned aerial vehicles of World War I

List of weapons of the Royal Naval Air Service

Armoured Cars
 Delaunay-Belleville armoured car
 Lanchester armoured car
 Pierce-Arrow armoured lorry
 Rolls-Royce Armoured Car
 Seabrook armoured lorry
 Talbot armoured car

Machine guns
 0.303-inch (7.7-mm) Lewis gun
 0.303-inch (7.7-mm) Vickers machine gun

Torpedoes
 British 18-inch torpedo

See also
 List of aircraft of the Fleet Air Arm
 List of aircraft of the Royal Air Force
 List of aircraft of the Royal Flying Corps
 List of British airships

References

Bibliography

External links

Royal Naval Air Service aircraft
Royal Naval Air Service
Royal Naval Air Service
United Kingdom Royal Naval Air Service
Royal Navy lists